Dragan Marković (born 11 October 1969) is a Bosnian professional handball coach and former player who is the head coach of German club VfL Schalksmuhl. He previously worked as head coach of the Bosnia and Herzegovina men's national handball team, who he qualified for the 2015 World Men's Handball Championship.

Honours

Coach

Individual
Bosnia and Herzegovina Coach of the Year: 2014

References

1969 births
Living people
Sportspeople from Banja Luka
RK Borac Banja Luka players
Handball coaches
Place of birth missing (living people)
Bosnia and Herzegovina handball coaches
Handball coaches of international teams